Bolívar Municipality is one of the 29 municipalities that makes up the western Venezuelan state of Táchira and, according to a 2007 population estimate by the National Institute of Statistics of Venezuela, the municipality has a population of 60,149.  The town of San Antonio del Táchira is the shiretown of the Bolívar Municipality.

Name
The municipality is one of several in Venezuela named "Bolívar Municipality" in honour of Venezuelan independence hero Simón Bolívar.

Demographics
The Bolívar Municipality, according to a 2007 population estimate by the National Institute of Statistics of Venezuela, has a population of 60,149 (up from 50,209 in 2000). This amounts to 5.1% of the state's population.

Government
The mayor of the Bolívar Municipality is Juan Vicente Cañas Alviarez, elected on October 31, 2004, with 48% of the vote.  He replaced Ramon Vivas shortly after the elections.  The municipality is divided into four parishes; Bolívar, Palotal, Juan Vicente Gómez, and Isaías Medina Angarita (parishes Juan Vicente Gómez and Isaías Medina Angarita were officially separated from the Bolívar parish on January 25, 1995).

References

External links
bolivar-tachira.gob.ve  
Information on the Bolívar Municipality 
More information on the Bolívar Municipality 

Municipalities of Táchira